Robert William "Bobby" Ott (born November 17, 1962 in Inglewood, California) is an American former international motorcycle speedway rider. He was a member of the USA speedway team when they won the 1992 and 1993 World Team Cup Finals.

He rode in the UK for the Hull Vikings, Belle Vue Aces and Wimbledon Dons.

References

1962 births
Living people
American speedway riders
Belle Vue Aces riders
Sportspeople from Inglewood, California